Stoddard–O'Connor House is a historic home located at Lowville in Lewis County, New York.  It was built in 1898, and is a -story, asymmetrical frame dwelling with Queen Anne and Colonial Revival style design elements.  It features a half-height entry porch and projecting stacked bay.  Also on the property is a contributing carriage house (c. 1900).

It was listed on the National Register of Historic Places in 2011.

References

Houses on the National Register of Historic Places in New York (state)
Queen Anne architecture in New York (state)
Colonial Revival architecture in New York (state)
Houses completed in 1898
Buildings and structures in Lewis County, New York
National Register of Historic Places in Lewis County, New York
1898 establishments in New York (state)